Radovan Lale Djuric (May 1945 – April 2014) was a Serbian-American artist and the founder of the Nis Art Foundation.

Radovan "Lale" Djuric, widely know simply as "Lale" started studying art at the College of Architecture in Nis, Serbia. After his studies in Nis, Radovan Lale Djuric went on to work at the Nation Theatre in Belgrade, Serbia as a set designer before studying fine art in Belgrade, Venice, Amsterdam, and Paris.

Lale went on to work with the Dalmas design firm in Paris before moving to the United States for the remainder of his career.  After moving to the United States in the 1970s, he set up his own gallery space called "Lale's space" on East 72nd street in Manhattan, NY. Lale displayed his own artwork, including his large folding panels.

References

1945 births
2014 deaths
American people of Serbian descent